The 2007 Kansas City Royals season was the 39th season for the franchise, and their 37th at Kauffman Stadium. the season began with the team attempting to win the Central Division of the American League - a task not achieved since the division was formed in 1994.

In trying to improve on their 62–100 record in the 2006 season, the team avoided a fourth straight 100-loss season. Buddy Bell returned for his second and final full season as manager, while Dayton Moore began his first season as the team's general manager.

Anticipation surrounded the Royals' newfound approach to once again become a playoff contender with rebuilding the roster. Roster moves generated much interest in the Kansas City area, including the big-budget signing of starting pitcher Gil Meche, and the arrival of young, new talent—such as rookie third baseman Alex Gordon and designated hitter Billy Butler.  The team's payroll for the 2007 season was increased to $67 million (22nd in the major leagues).

Free agency and roster moves
The biggest free-agent pickups for the Royals in 2007 included RHP Gil Meche—who was signed to a 5-year, $55 million deal—and RHP Octavio Dotel, who quickly became trade bait to the Atlanta Braves.

(x) = club option for 2007
(m) = mutual option for 2007
(y) = player option for 2007

Color Code Key

Regular season

Season summary

April
The Royals began the season with expectations of improvement from their fans, and the team never ceased to impress in their home opener against the Boston Red Sox.  The Royals defeated the Red Sox 7–1 in front of the sold-out home crowd.  The magic did not last, however—Kansas City was just 3–7 through the first ten games of the season, and 8–18 by the end of April.

May
The Royals hit minor spots of winning when the team won 8 of 10 games from May 13 to 23, but finished the month of May on a seven-game losing streak with series sweeps by the Seattle Mariners and Baltimore Orioles. Kansas City went 11–17 in May and finished the month with an overall record of 19–35.

June
In the 2007 MLB draft held on June 7, the Royals selected shortstop Mike Moustakas at No. 2 overall. The team went 15–12 in June, their first winning month since July 2003. Pitcher Brian Bannister won the American League Rookie of the Month Award.

July
Gil Meche was the only Royal selected to represent the team at the 2007 Major League Baseball All-Star Game in San Francisco. At the All-Star break, the Royals had a record of 38–50 and the lowest team ERA in 13 years. On July 31, the Royals traded pitcher Octavio Dotel to the Atlanta Braves for pitcher Kyle Davies. The Royals went 13–12 in July, giving the team its first consecutive winning months since June and July 2003. Billy Butler won the Rookie of the Month Award.

August
On August 1, manager Buddy Bell announced his intention to resign following the 2007 season before a game against the Minnesota Twins. Also, about an hour before the first pitch, the Interstate 35W bridge over the Mississippi River in downtown Minneapolis collapsed with a death toll of at 13. Before the game, a moment of silence was held for the victims of the collapse. The team rescheduled their August 2 game against the Twins to the afternoon of August 31 for a double-header. Brian Bannister won his second Rookie of the Month Award for the season. The Royals went 13–15 in August, completing a three-month stretch in which the team compiled a record of 41–39.

September
On September 12, the Royals defeated the Minnesota Twins 6–3 to win their 63rd game, guaranteeing that they would not lose 100 games in 2007. The victory ended the team's string of three consecutive seasons of 100 losses of more from 2004 to 2006.  While the Royals struggled with a 9–19 record in September, their overall record of 69–93 was the team's best finish since 2003.

Season standings

Record vs. opponents

Roster

Game log

|- style="background-color:#bbffbb"
| 1 || April 2 || Red Sox || 7 – 1 || Meche (1-0)|| Schilling (0-1) || || 41,257 || 1-0
|- style="background-color:#ffbbbb"
| 2 || April 4 || Red Sox || 7 – 1 || Beckett (1-0) || Pérez (0-1) || || 22,348 || 1-1
|- style="background-color:#ffbbbb"
| 3 || April 5 || Red Sox || 4 – 1 || Matsuzaka (1-0) || Greinke (0-1) || Papelbon (1) || 23,170 || 1-2
|- style="background-color:#bbffbb"
| 4 || April 6 || Tigers || 3 – 1 || de la Rosa (1-0) || Mesa (0-1) || Riske (1) || 13,330 || 2-2
|- style="background-color:#ffbbbb"
| 5 || April 7 || Tigers || 6 – 5 || Maroth (1-0) ||Meche (1-1) || Jones (2) || 13,899 || 2-3
|- style="background-color:#ffbbbb"
| 6 || April 8 || Tigers || 3 – 2 || Rodney (1-1) || Riske (0-1) || Jones (3) || 13,109 || 2-4
|- style="background-color:#ffbbbb"
| 7 || April 9 || @ Blue Jays || 9 – 1 || Burnett (1-1) || Pérez (0-2) || || 50,125 || 2-5
|- style="background-color:#bbffbb"
| 8 || April 10 || @ Blue Jays || 5 – 3 || Greinke (1-1) || Towers (0-1) || Soria (1) || 22,106 || 3-5
|- style="background-color:#ffbbbb"
| 9 || April 11 || @ Blue Jays || 7 – 4 || Chacín (1-0) || de la Rosa (1-1) || Ryan (3) || 15,218 || 3-6
|- style="background-color:#ffbbbb"
| 10 || April 12 || @ Orioles || 2 – 1  || Ray (1-1) || Standridge (0-1) || || 13,229 || 3-7
|- style="background-color:#ffbbbb"
| 11 || April 13 || @ Orioles || 8 – 1 || Bédard (2-1) || Duckworth (0-1) || || 20,922 || 3-8
|- style="background-color:#ffbbbb"
| 12 || April 14 || @ Orioles || 6 – 4 || Williamson (1-0) || Peralta (0-1) || Ray (3) || 15,244 || 3-9
|- style="background-color:#bbbbbb"
| -- || April 15 || @ Orioles || colspan=5|Postponed (rain)  || 3-9
|- style="background-color:#ffbbbb"
| 13 || April 16 || @ Tigers || 12 – 5 || Verlander (1-0) || Greinke (1-2) || || 21,832 || 3-10
|- style="background-color:#ffbbbb"
| 14 || April 17 || @ Tigers || 7 – 6 || Ledezma (3-0) || Riske (0-2) || Jones (7) || 21,263 || 3-11
|- style="background-color:#bbffbb"
| 15 || April 18 || @ Tigers || 4 – 3  || Soria (1-0) || Rodney (1-3) || || 27,945 || 4-11
|- style="background-color:#bbffbb"
| 16 || April 20 || Twins || 11 – 7 ||  Pérez (1-2) || Ponson (1-2) || Riske (2) || 31,813 || 5-11
|- style="background-color:#ffbbbb"
| 17 || April 21 || Twins ||7 – 5 ||Neshek (2-0) ||Peralta (0-2) ||Nathan (6) || 20,566|| 5-12
|- style="background-color:#bbffbb"
| 18 || April 22 || Twins || 3 – 1 || de la Rosa (2-1) || Ortiz (3-1) || Soria (2) || 14,801 || 6-12
|- style="background-color:#ffbbbb"
| 19 || April 23 || White Sox || 7 – 4 || Buehrle (2-0) || Gobble (0-1) || Jenks (7) || 12,265 || 6-13
|- style="background-color:#ffbbbb"
| 20 || April 24 || White Sox || 9 – 7 || Logan (1-0) || Soria (1-1) || Jenks (8) || 14,907 || 6-14
|- style="background-color:#bbffbb"
| 21 || April 25 || @ Twins || 4 – 3 || Pérez (2-2) || Ponson (1-3) || Soria (3) || 21,496 || 7-14
|- style="background-color:#ffbbbb"
| 22 || April 26 || @ Twins || 1 – 0  || Rincón (1-0) || Wellemeyer (0-1) || || 18,520 || 7-15
|- style="background-color:#ffbbbb"
| 23 || April 27 || @ Mariners || 7 – 4 || Ramírez (2-1) || de la Rosa (2-2) || Putz (3) || 37,281 || 7-16
|- style="background-color:#bbffbb"
| 24 || April 28 || @ Mariners || 8 – 3 || Meche (2-1) || Weaver (0-4) || Duckworth (1) || 32,441 || 8-16
|- style="background-color:#ffbbbb"
| 25 || April 29 || @ Mariners || 5 – 1 || Morrow (2-0) || Bannister (0-1) ||  || 26,019 || 8-17
|- style="background-color:#ffbbbb"
| 26 || April 30 || Angels || 3 – 1 || Lackey (4-2) || Pérez (2-3) || Rodríguez (9) || 10,866 || 8-18

|- style="background-color:#ffbbbb"
| 27 || May 1 || Angels || 7 – 5 || Colón (3-0) || Greinke (1-3) || Rodríguez (10) || 11,225 || 8-19
|- style="background-color:#bbffbb"
| 28 || May 2 || Angels || 3 – 1 || de la Rosa (3-2) || Santana (2-4) || Soria (4) || 9,697 || 9-19
|- style="background-color:#bbffbb"
| 29 || May 3 || Angels || 5 – 2 || Meche (3-1) || Weaver (1-3) || Soria (5) || 12,683 || 10-19
|- style="background-color:#ffbbbb"
| 30 || May 4 || Tigers || 6 – 3 || Verlander (2-1) || Bannister (0-2) || Jones (11) || 17,614 || 10-20
|- style="background-color:#ffbbbb"
| 31 || May 5 || Tigers || 7 – 5 || Mesa (1-1) || Duckworth (0-2)  || Jones (12) || 26,070 || 10-21
|- style="background-color:#ffbbbb"
| 32 || May 6 || Tigers || 13 – 4 || Durbin (2-1) || Greinke (1-4) || || 17,034 || 10-22
|- style="background-color:#ffbbbb"
| 33 || May 8 || Athletics || 6 – 1 || Gaudin (2-1) || de la Rosa (3-3) || || 10,989 || 10-23
|- style="background-color:#bbffbb"
| 34 || May 9 || Athletics || 3 – 2 || Gobble (1-1) || Duchscherer (3-2) || Soria (6) || 10,974 || 11-23
|- style="background-color:#ffbbbb"
| 35 || May 10 || Athletics || 17 – 3 || Kennedy (1-2) || Hudson (0-1) || || 31,006 || 11-24
|- style="background-color:#ffbbbb"
| 36 || May 11 || @ White Sox || 2 – 1 || Garland (2-2) || Pérez (2-4) || Jenks (12) || 34,522 || 11-25
|- style="background-color:#ffbbbb"
| 37 || May 12 || @ White Sox || 5 – 4  || MacDougal (1-0) || Duckworth (0-3) || || 36,702 || 11-26
|- style="background-color:#bbffbb"
| 38 || May 13 || @ White Sox || 11 – 1 || de la Rosa (4-3) || Vázquez (2-2) || || 34,468 || 12-26
|- style="background-color:#bbffbb"
| 39 || May 14 || @ Athletics || 2 – 1 || Gobble (2-1) || Duchscherer (3-3) || Soria (7) || 12,477 || 13-26
|- style="background-color:#ffbbbb"
| 40 || May 15 || @ Athletics || 5 – 4  || DiNardo (1-1) || Soria (1-2) || || 14,966 || 13-27
|- style="background-color:#bbffbb"
| 41 || May 16 || @ Athletics || 4 – 3 || Gobble (3-1) || Calero (0-3) || Riske (3) || 16,242 || 14-27
|- style="background-color:#bbffbb"
| 42 || May 17 || @ Athletics || 7 – 4 || Elarton (1-0) || Braden (1-3) || Soria (8) || 21,037 || 15-27
|- style="background-color:#bbffbb"
| 43 || May 18 || @ Rockies || 5 – 2 || Duckworth (1-3) || Corpas (0-2) || Soria (9) || 22,399 || 16-27
|- style="background-color:#ffbbbb"
| 44 || May 19 || @ Rockies || 6 – 4 || Buchholz (2-2) || Meche (3-2) || Fuentes (11) || 24,017 || 16-28
|- style="background-color:#bbffbb"
| 45 || May 20 || @ Rockies || 10 – 5  || Peralta (1-2) || Ramírez (1-1) || || 25,829 || 17-28
|- style="background-color:#bbffbb"
| 46 || May 22 || Indians || 4 – 3 || Greinke (2-4) || Mastny (3-2) || Soria (10) || 19,776 || 18-28
|- style="background-color:#bbffbb"
| 47 || May 23 || Indians || 11 – 7 || Duckworth (2-3) || Lee (2-1) || || 11,506 || 19-28
|- style="background-color:#ffbbbb"
| 48 || May 24 || Indians || 10 – 3 || Sowers (1-4) || de la Rosa (4-4) || || 11,681 || 19-29
|- style="background-color:#ffbbbb"
| 49 || May 25 || Mariners || 10 – 2 || Hernández (3-2) || Meche (3-3) || || 28,651 || 19-30
|- style="background-color:#ffbbbb"
| 50 || May 26 || Mariners || 9 – 1 || Baek (2-2) || Bannister (0-3) || || 21,138 || 19-31
|- style="background-color:#ffbbbb"
| 51 || May 27 || Mariners || 7 – 4 || Washburn (5-4) || Pérez (2-5) || Putz (12) || 16,091 || 19-32
|- style="background-color:#ffbbbb"
| 52 || May 28 || Orioles || 9 – 1 || Trachsel (4-3) || Elarton (1-1) || || 14,758 || 19-33
|- style="background-color:#ffbbbb"
| 53 || May 29 || Orioles || 6 – 2 || Guthrie (3-1) || de la Rosa (4-5) || || 13,556 || 19-34
|- style="background-color:#ffbbbb"
| 54 || May 30 || Orioles || 3 – 0 || Bédard (4-3) || Meche (3-4) || Ray (12) || 10,513 || 19-35

|- style="background-color:#bbffbb"
| 55 || June 1 || @ Devil Rays || 4 – 1 || Bannister (1-3) || Kazmir (3-3) || Dotel (1) || 12,032 || 20-35
|- style="background-color:#bbffbb"
| 56 || June 2 || @ Devil Rays || 9 – 4 || Pérez (3-5) || Jackson (0-7) || || 14,403 || 21-35
|- style="background-color:#ffbbbb"
| 57 || June 3 || @ Devil Rays || 5 – 1 || Howell (1-0) || Elarton (1-2) || || 12,220 || 21-36
|- style="background-color:#ffbbbb"
| 58 || June 4 || @ Devil Rays || 4 – 2 || Shields (5-0) || Meche (3-5) || Reyes (14) || 9,435 || 21-37
|- style="background-color:#ffbbbb"
| 59 || June 5 || @ Indians || 1 – 0 || Sabathia (9-1) || de la Rosa (4-6) || || 14,036 || 21-38
|- style="background-color:#bbffbb"
| 60 || June 6 || @ Indians || 4 – 3 || Bannister (2-3) || Byrd (6-2) || Dotel (2) || 17,632 || 22-38
|- style="background-color:#ffbbbb"
| 61 || June 7 || @ Indians || 8 – 3 || Carmona (7-1) || Pérez (3-6) || || 19,315 || 22-39
|- style="background-color:#bbffbb"
| 62 || June 8 || Phillies || 8 – 4 || Elarton (2-2) || García (1-5) || Dotel (3) || 19,121 || 23-39
|- style="background-color:#ffbbbb"
| 63 || June 9 || Phillies || 4 – 0 || Lieber (3-4) || Meche (3-6)  || || 23,734 || 23-40
|- style="background-color:#bbffbb"
| 64 || June 10 || Phillies || 17 – 5 || Greinke (3-4) || Moyer (5-5) || || 16,034 || 24-40
|- style="background-color:#bbffbb"
| 65 || June 12 || Cardinals || 8 – 1 || Bannister (3-3) || Thompson (4-2) || || 29,354 || 25-40
|- style="background-color:#ffbbbb"
| 66 || June 13 || Cardinals || 7 – 3 || Wainwright (5-5) || Pérez (3-7) || || 25,555 || 25-41
|- style="background-color:#bbffbb"
| 67 || June 14 || Cardinals || 17 – 8 || Greinke (4-4) || Wells (2-11) || || 28,837 || 26-41
|- style="background-color:#bbffbb"
| 68 || June 15 || Marlins || 6 – 2 || Meche (4-6) || Mitre (2-3) || Dotel (4) || 28,015 || 27-41
|- style="background-color:#ffbbbb"
| 69 || June 16 || Marlins || 9 – 8 || VandenHurk (2-2) || de la Rosa (4-7) || Gregg (11) || 24,323 || 27-42
|- style="background-color:#bbffbb"
| 70 || June 17 || Marlins || 5 – 4 || Bannister (4-3) || Olsen (5-6) || Dotel (5) || 19,433 || 28-42
|- style="background-color:#bbffbb"
| 71 || June 18 || @ Cardinals || 5 – 3 || Pérez (4-7) || Wainwright (5-6) || Dotel (6) || 43,524 || 29-42
|- style="background-color:#ffbbbb"
| 72 || June 19 || @ Cardinals || 5 – 1 || Thompson (5-2) || Elarton (2-3) || || 42,712 || 29-43
|- style="background-color:#ffbbbb"
| 73 || June 20 || @ Cardinals || 7 – 6  || Wells (3-11) || de la Rosa (4-8) || || 42,623 || 29-44
|- style="background-color:#ffbbbb"
| 74 || June 22 || @ Brewers || 11 – 6 || Suppan (8-7) || de la Rosa (4-9) || || 36,328 || 29-45
|- style="background-color:#ffbbbb"
| 75 || June 23 || @ Brewers || 7 – 1 || Bush (5-6) || Bannister (4-4) || || 41,721 || 29-46
|- style="background-color:#bbffbb"
| 76 || June 24 || @ Brewers || 4 – 3  || Riske (1-2) || Capellán (0-2) || Gobble (1) || 44,064 || 30-46
|- style="background-color:#bbffbb"
| 77 || June 25 || @ Angels || 5 – 3 || Thomson (1-0) || Lackey (10-5) || Dotel (7) || 43,895 || 31-46
|- style="background-color:#bbffbb"
| 78 || June 26 || @ Angels || 12 – 4 || Meche (5-6) || Santana (5-8) || || 44,002 || 32-46
|- style="background-color:#bbffbb"
| 79 || June 27 || @ Angels || 1 – 0 || de la Rosa (5-9) || Weaver (6-4) || Dotel (8) || 41,269 || 33-46
|- style="background-color:#bbffbb"
| 80 || June 29 || White Sox || 8 – 1 || Bannister (5-4) || Contreras (5-9) || Greinke (1) || 20,525 || 34-46
|- style="background-color:#ffbbbb"
| 81 || June 30 || White Sox || 3 – 1  || Bukvich (1-0) || Dotel (0-1) || Jenks (21) || 25,119 || 34-47

|- style="background-color:#ffbbbb"
| 82 || July 1 || White Sox || 3 – 1 || Garland (6-5) || Thomson (1-1) || Jenks (22) || 23,004 || 34-48
|- style="background-color:#bbffbb"
| 83 || July 2 || Mariners || 3 – 2  || Dotel (1-1) || Morrow (3-2) || || 13,257 || 35-48
|- style="background-color:#bbffbb"
| 84 || July 3 || Mariners || 17 – 3 || de la Rosa (6-9) || Feierabend (1-3) || || 28,140 || 36-48
|- style="background-color:#ffbbbb"
| 85 || July 4 || Mariners || 4 – 0 || Washburn (8-6) || Bannister (5-5) || Putz (24) || 27,797 || 36-49
|- style="background-color:#ffbbbb"
| 86 || July 6 || Devil Rays || 6 – 5 || Shields (7-4) || Pérez (4-8) || Glover (1) || 18,753 || 36-50
|- style="background-color:#bbffbb"
| 87 || July 7 || Devil Rays || 8 – 7 || Dotel (2-1) || Shawn Camp (0-3) || || 20,458 || 37-50
|- style="background-color:#bbffbb"
| 88 || July 8 || Devil Rays || 12 – 4 || de la Rosa (7-9) || Kazmir (5-6) || || 14,726 || 38-50
|- style="background-color:#ffbbbb"
| 89 || July 13 || @ Indians || 5 – 4 || Borowski (2-3) || Greinke (4-5) || || 32,624 || 38-51
|- style="background-color:#bbffbb"
| 90 || July 14 || @ Indians || 6 – 5 || Meche (6-6) || Sabathia (12-4) || Dotel (9) || 31,599 || 39-51
|- style="background-color:#ffbbbb"
| 91 || July 15 || @ Indians || 5 – 3 || Carmona (11-4) || de la Rosa (7-10) || Borowski (26) || 29,657 || 39-52
|- style="background-color:#ffbbbb"
| 92 || July 16 || @ Red Sox || 4 – 0 || Gabbard (3-0) || Bannister (5-6) || || 37,099 || 39-53
|- style="background-color:#bbffbb"
| 93 || July 17 || @ Red Sox || 9 – 3 || Gobble (4-1) || Wakefield (10-9) || || 37,001 || 40-53
|- style="background-color:#bbffbb"
| 94 || July 18 || @ Red Sox || 6 – 5 || Pérez (5-8) || Tavárez (5-8) || Dotel (10) || 36,681 || 41-53
|- style="background-color:#bbffbb"
| 95 || July 20 || @ Tigers || 10 – 2 || Meche (7-6) || Rogers (3-2) || || 43,200 || 42-53
|- style="background-color:#ffbbbb"
| 96 || July 21 || @ Tigers || 10 – 8  || Durbin (7-3) || Soria (1-3) || || 43,408 || 42-54
|- style="background-color:#bbffbb"
| 97 || July 22 || @ Tigers || 5 – 2 || Bannister (6-6) || Robertson (6-7) || || 42,201 || 43-54
|- style="background-color:#ffbbbb"
| 98 || July 23 || Yankees || 9 – 2 || Clemens (3-4) || Pérez (5-9) || || 30,746 || 43-55
|- style="background-color:#ffbbbb"
| 99 || July 24 || Yankees || 9 – 4 || Wang (11-5) || Elarton (2-4) || || 38,212 || 43-56
|- style="background-color:#ffbbbb"
| 100 || July 25 || Yankees || 7 – 1 || Mussina (5-7) || Meche (7-7) || || 28,460 || 43-57
|- style="background-color:#bbffbb"
| 101 || July 26 || Yankees || 7 – 0 || de la Rosa (8-10) || Igawa (2-3) || || 37,036 || 44-57
|- style="background-color:#bbffbb"
| 102 || July 27 || Rangers || 6 – 1 || Bannister (7-6) || Wright (3-3) || || 21,730 || 45-57
|- style="background-color:#bbffbb"
| 103 || July 28 || Rangers || 6 – 5 || Pérez (6-9) || Millwood (7-9) || Dotel (11) || 27,700 || 46-57
|- style="background-color:#bbffbb"
| 104 || July 29 || Rangers || 10 – 0 || Núñez (1-0) || Loe (5-9) || Peralta (1) || 15,638 || 47-57
|- style="background-color:#ffbbbb"
| 105 || July 30 || @ Twins || 3 – 1 || Baker (5-4) || Meche (7-8) || Nathan (23) || 23,628 || 47-58
|- style="background-color:#ffbbbb"
| 106 || July 31 || @ Twins || 5 – 3 || Silva (9-11) || de la Rosa (8-11) || Nathan (24) || 22,890 || 47-59

|- style="background-color:#bbffbb"
| 107 || August 1 || @ Twins || 5 – 3  || Greinke (5-5)|| Rincón (3-2) || Soria (11) || 24,880 || 48-59
|- style="background-color:#bbbbbb"
| --- || August 2 || @ Twins ||colspan=5|Postponed (I-35W bridge collapse) || 48-59
|- style="background-color:#ffbbbb"
| 108 || August 3 || @ Yankees || 7 – 1 || Wang (13-5) || Pérez (6-10) || || 54,246 || 48-60
|- style="background-color:#ffbbbb"
| 109 || August 4 || @ Yankees || 16 – 8 || Myers (1-0) || Bale (0-1) || || 54,056 || 48-61
|- style="background-color:#ffbbbb"
| 110 || August 5 || @ Yankees || 8 – 5 || Mussina (7-7) || Meche (7-9) || Rivera (17) || 54,525 || 48-62
|- style="background-color:#bbffbb"
| 111 || August 7 || Twins || 5 – 1 || Bannister (8-6) || Bonser (5-8) || || 15,648 || 49-62
|- style="background-color:#ffbbbb"
| 112 || August 8 || Twins || 11 – 4 || Santana (12-9)|| Pérez (6-11) ||  || 21,503 || 49-63
|- style="background-color:#bbffbb"
| 113 || August 9 || Twins || 1 – 0 || Davies (5-8) || Garza (1-3)|| Soria (12) || 14,569 || 50-63
|- style="background-color:#ffbbbb"
| 114 || August 10 || Blue Jays || 2 – 1 || Marcum (9-4) || Meche (7-10) || Accardo (21) || 21,276 || 50-64
|- style="background-color:#bbffbb"
| 115 || August 11 || Blue Jays || 4 – 1 || Núñez (2-0) || McGowan (8-6) || Soria (13) || 25,934 || 51-64
|- style="background-color:#ffbbbb"
| 116 || August 12 || Blue Jays || 4 – 1 || Burnett (6-6) || Bannister (8-7) || Accardo (22) || 18,381 || 51-65
|- style="background-color:#bbffbb"
| 117 || August 13 || Blue Jays || 6 – 2 || Pérez (7-11) || Litsch (4-5) || || 14,845 || 52-65
|- style="background-color:#ffbbbb"
| 118 || August 14 || @ Rangers || 5 – 3 || Millwood (8-9) || Davies (5-9) || Wilson (5) || 23,906 || 52-66
|- style="background-color:#ffbbbb"
| 119 || August 15 || @ Rangers || 4 – 3 || Wood (3-1) || Meche (7-11) || Wilson (6) || 24,529 || 52-67
|- style="background-color:#bbffbb"
| 120 || August 16 || @ Rangers || 6 – 2 || Braun (1-0) || Eyre (4-6) || || 22,674 || 53-67
|- style="background-color:#bbffbb"
| 121 || August 17 || @ Athletics || 9 – 2 || Bannister (9-7) || Meyer (0-1) || || 18,185 || 54-67
|- style="background-color:#bbffbb"
| 122 || August 18 || @ Athletics || 7 – 3 || Pérez (8-11) || Gaudin (9-9) || || 24,638 || 55-67
|- style="background-color:#ffbbbb"
| 123 || August 19 || @ Athletics || 6 – 1 || DiNardo (8-6) || Davies (5-10) || || 26,445 || 55-68
|- style="background-color:#ffbbbb"
| 124 || August 20 || @ White Sox || 4 – 3 || Thornton (4-4) || Riske (1-3) || Jenks (34) || 35,391 || 55-69
|- style="background-color:#ffbbbb"
| 125 || August 21 || @ White Sox || 5 – 2 || Vázquez (11-6) || Núñez (2-1) || Jenks (35) || 35,309 || 55-70
|- style="background-color:#bbffbb"
| 126 || August 22 || @ White Sox || 7 – 6 || Bannister (10-7) || Contreras (6-16) || || 31,739 || 56-70
|- style="background-color:#bbffbb"
| 127 || August 24 || Indians || 2 – 1 || Bale (1-1) || Sabathia (14-7) || Soria (14) || 25,640 || 57-70
|- style="background-color:#ffbbbb"
| 128 || August 25 || Indians || 9 – 4 || Laffey (2-1) || Davies (5-11) || || 23,167 || 57-71
|- style="background-color:#ffbbbb"
| 129 || August 26 || Indians || 5 – 3  || Betancourt (3-0) || Peralta (1-3) || Borowski (37) || 18,268 || 57-72
|- style="background-color:#bbffbb"
| 130 || August 28 || Tigers || 6 – 3 || Bannister (11-7) || Robertson (7-11) || || 16,193 || 58-72
|- style="background-color:#bbffbb"
| 131 || August 29 || Tigers || 5 – 0 || Braun (2-0) || Miller (5-5) || Riske (4) || 11,628 || 59-72
|- style="background-color:#ffbbbb"
| 132 || August 30 || Tigers || 6 – 1 || Bonderman (11-7) || Núñez (2-2) || || 11,196 || 59-73
|- style="background-color:#bbffbb"
| 133 || August 31 || @ Twins || 9 – 4 || Davies (6-11) || Garza (3-5) || || 15,736 || 60-73
|- style="background-color:#ffbbbb"
| 134 || August 31 || @ Twins || 5 – 0 || Baker (8-6) || Meche (7-12) || || 24,986 || 60-74

|- style="background-color:#ffbbbb"
| 135 || September 1 || @ Twins || 6 – 4 || Silva (11-13) || Duckworth (2-4) || Nathan (29) || 21,738 || 60-75
|- style="background-color:#bbffbb"
| 136 || September 2 || @ Twins || 8 – 1 || Bannister (12-7) || Bonser (6-12) || || 26,454 || 61-75
|- style="background-color:#bbffbb"
| 137 || September 3 || @ Rangers || 8 – 1 || Greinke (6-5) || Loe (6-11) || || 19,214 || 62-75
|- style="background-color:#ffbbbb"
| 138 || September 4 || @ Rangers || 9 – 8 || Rheinecker (2-1) || Núñez (2-3) || Wilson (11) || 18,892 || 62-76
|- style="background-color:#ffbbbb"
| 139 || September 5 || @ Rangers || 3 – 2 || Padilla (5-9) || Davies (6-12) || Benoit (3) || 17,232 || 62-77
|- style="background-color:#ffbbbb"
| 140 || September 7 || Yankees || 3 – 2 || Farnsworth (2-1) || Musser (0-1) || Rivera (24) || 27,462 || 62-78
|- style="background-color:#ffbbbb"
| 141 || September 8 || Yankees || 11 – 5 || Pettitte (13-8) || Bannister (12-8) || || 35,518 || 62-79
|- style="background-color:#ffbbbb"
| 142 || September 9 || Yankees || 6 – 3 || Wang (18-6)  || Duckworth (2-5) || Rivera (25) || 24,910 || 62-80
|- style="background-color:#ffbbbb"
| 143 || September 10 || Twins || 4 – 2 || Bonser (7-12) || Buckner (0-1) || Nathan (31) || 10,525 || 62-81
|- style="background-color:#ffbbbb"
| 144 || September 11 || Twins || 6 – 3 || Baker (9-7) || Davies (6-13) || Nathan (32) || 12,891 || 62-82
|- style="background-color:#bbffbb"
| 145 || September 12 || Twins || 6 – 3 || Meche (8-12) || Silva (11-14) || || 10,102 || 63-82
|- style="background-color:#ffbbbb"
| 146 || September 14 || @ Indians || 5 – 4 || Borowski (4-5) || Riske (1-4) || || 35,230 || 63-83
|- style="background-color:#ffbbbb"
| 147 || September 15 || @ Indians || 6 – 0 || Carmona (17-8) || Greinke (6-6) || || 32,113 || 63-84
|- style="background-color:#bbffbb"
| 148 || September 16 || @ Indians || 4 – 3 || Buckner (1-1) || Laffey (3-2) || Soria (15) || 30,112 || 64-84
|- style="background-color:#ffbbbb"
| 149 || September 17 || White Sox || 11 – 3 || Vázquez (13-8) || Davies (6-14) || || 14,421 || 64-85
|- style="background-color:#bbffbb"
| 150 || September 18 || White Sox || 3 – 2 || Meche (9-12) || Floyd (1-4) || Soria (16) || 15,015 || 65-85
|- style="background-color:#ffbbbb"
| 151 || September 19 || White Sox || 7 – 0 || Contreras (10-16) || Bannister (12-9) || || 11,857 || 65-86
|- style="background-color:#bbffbb"
| 152 || September 20 || White Sox || 3 – 0 || Greinke (7-6) || Garland (9-13) || Soria (17) || 10,264 || 66-86
|- style="background-color:#ffbbbb"
| 153 || September 21 || @ Tigers || 5 – 4 || Byrdak (2-0) || Núñez (2-4) || Jones (38) || 40,117 || 66-87
|- style="background-color:#bbffbb"
| 154 || September 22 || @ Tigers || 7 – 4 || Davies (7-14) || Rogers (3-3) || || 41,792 || 67-87
|- style="background-color:#ffbbbb"
| 155 || September 23 || @ Tigers || 7 – 2 || Verlander (18-6) || de la Rosa (8-12) || || 40,068 || 67-88
|- style="background-color:#ffbbbb"
| 156 || September 24 || @ Orioles || 3 – 2 || Walker (3-2) || Meche (9-13) || Bradford (2) || 15,769 || 67-89
|- style="background-color:#bbffbb"
| 157 || September 25 || @ White Sox || 9 – 5 || Duckworth (3-5) || Wassermann (0-1) || || 31,607 || 68-89
|- style="background-color:#ffbbbb"
| 158 || September 26 || @ White Sox || 3 – 0 || Garland (10-13) || Greinke (7-7) || || 32,091 || 68-90
|- style="background-color:#ffbbbb"
| 159 || September 27 || @ White Sox || 10 – 0 || Broadway (1-1) || Buckner (1-2) || || 34,477 || 68-91
|- style="background-color:#ffbbbb"
| 160 || September 28 || Indians || 5 – 3 || Sabathia (19-7) || Davies (7-15) || Borowski (44) || 29,846 || 68-92
|- style="background-color:#bbffbb"
| 161 || September 29 || Indians || 4 – 3 || Soria (2-3) || Pérez (1-2) || || 24,274 || 69-92
|- style="background-color:#ffbbbb"
| 162 || September 30 || Indians || 4 – 2 || Laffey (4-2) || Hochevar (0-1) || Borowski (45) || 19,104 || 69-93

Statistical team leaders

Batting

Pitching

Stats as of September 30, 2007

Royals among league leaders

Batting

Pitching

Stats as of September 30, 2007

Player stats

Batting
Note: G = Games played; AB = At bats; R = Runs; H = Hits; 2B = Doubles; 3B = Triples; HR = Home runs; RBI = Runs batted in; SB = Stolen bases; BB = Walks; AVG = Batting average; SLG = Slugging average

Source:

Pitching
Note: W = Wins; L = Losses; ERA = Earned run average; G = Games pitched; GS = Games started; SV = Saves; IP = Innings pitched; H = Hits allowed; R = Runs allowed; ER = Earned runs allowed; BB = Walks allowed; SO = Strikeouts

Source:

Awards and honors
Mike Sweeney, Hutch Award
2007 Major League Baseball All-Star Game
Gil Meche, pitcher, reserve

Farm system

References

Game Logs:
1st Half: Kansas City Royals Game Log on ESPN.com
2nd Half: Kansas City Royals Game Log on ESPN.com
Batting Statistics: Kansas City Royals Batting Stats on ESPN.com
Pitching Statistics: Kansas City Royals Pitching Stats on ESPN.com
2007 Kansas City Royals at Baseball Reference
Kansas City Royals: Official web site

Kansas City Royals seasons
Kansas City Royals season
Kansas